Sersalisia is a genus of trees in the family Sapotaceae described as a genus in 1810.

In the past, Sersalisia was much larger and more widely distributed than at present. Most of the former members of the genus have been transferred to other genera. Only two species remain, both endemic to Australia.

Species
 Sersalisia sericea (Aiton) R.Br. - Queensland, Northern Territory, Western Australia
 Sersalisia sessiliflora (C.T.White) Aubrév. - Queensland

References

Chrysophylloideae
Sapotaceae genera
Flora of Australia